Warszkajty  is a former village in the administrative district of Gmina Górowo Iławeckie, within Bartoszyce County, Warmian-Masurian Voivodeship, in northern Poland, directly at the border to the Kaliningrad Oblast of Russia.

Population 

1933: 286
1939: 321

References

Warszkajty